The Party of Freedom and Justice (SSP) is a social-democratic political party in Serbia. It is led by Dragan Đilas.

Founded in 2019 as the merger of the Green Ecological Party – The Greens and Serbian Left, SSP was a member of the Alliance for Serbia (SZS), a coalition of opposition political parties that was initiated by Đilas in 2018. Together with SZS, it boycotted the 2020 parliamentary election, claiming that the election would not be free and fair. After the election, SSP became part of the United Opposition of Serbia, the successor of SZS, though this coalition was dissolved in January 2023, due to disputes between SSP and the People's Party (Narodna). However, in late 2021, SSP and Narodna returned together with the Movement of Free Citizens and Democratic Party to form the United for the Victory of Serbia coalition, which was officially formalised in February 2022, to take part in the 2022 general election. SSP won 10 seats in the National Assembly and 6 seats in the City Assembly of Belgrade in the elections, while the UZPS coalition was dissolved after the meeting between Đilas and Aleksandar Vučić, the president of Serbia and the Serbian Progressive Party (SNS), in April 2022. Since then, SSP has formed the Ujedinjeni parliamentary group, while it lost one seat in the National Assembly in December 2022, when vice-president Dejan Bulatović left the party.

SSP is a centre-left political party and it serves in opposition to SNS. It is an anti-corruption party and is opposed to "party employment", while regarding economy, it has called for tax reforms that would bring in progressive taxation; SSP supports financing free textbooks and school meals for school children, and has called for the introduction of a new labour law. It supports the accession of Serbia to the European Union, wants Serbia to harmonise its foreign policy with the European Union, and initiate sanctions on Russia regarding the Russian invasion of Ukraine. SSP has criticised Chinese investments into infrastructure and it had adopted a platform in which they pledged "reconciliation, cooperation, and the acceptance of diversity" between countries in the Balkans. Supporters of SSP are pro-European while they also see themselves as socially progressive. SSP has cooperated with parties inside the Party of European Socialists, namely the Social Democratic Union of Macedonia and Social Democratic Party of Austria.

History

Background and formation 
The Party of Freedom and Justice (SSP) was formed out of the Green Ecological Party – The Greens (ZES–Zeleni), a political party which was established in 2008. Dejan Bulatović was the leader of ZES–Zeleni after 2015. He led the party into a coalition with the Greens of Serbia (ZS), which fell apart before the 2017 presidential election, and was a part of the "Civic Bloc 381" which was formed in 2018 and headed by the Movement of Free Citizens (PSG); ZES–Zeleni left the bloc in November 2018. A month later, ZES–Zeleni joined the Alliance for Serbia (SZS), an opposition political alliance initiated by Dragan Đilas in 2018. A series of anti-government protests began in December 2018 after an attack on Borko Stefanović; SZS supported the protests.

In March 2019, it was announced that Đilas made an agreement with Bulatović to reconstruct the party as SSP with Đilas as the party's president; Đilas previously stated that "he had no plans of buying ZES–Zeleni". Alongside ZES–Zeleni, the Serbian Left (LS), a political party led by Stefanović, and ten movements and individuals merged to create SSP. The founding convention was held on 19 April 2019, at which Đilas was chosen president, Stefanović as deputy president, and Bulatović and Marinika Tepić as vice-presidents. Following its formation, SSP gained two seats in the National Assembly of Serbia and 13 seats in the City Assembly of Belgrade.

2019–2021 
SSP announced that it would boycott the 2020 parliamentary election in September 2019, claiming that the election would not be free and fair. This position was adopted by SZS later that month. Mass protests that began in 2018 formally ended in March 2020 due to the proclamation of the COVID-19 pandemic in Serbia. After the June 2020 parliamentary election, SZS was dissolved and subsequently transformed into the United Opposition of Serbia (UOPS), in which SSP took part. However, UOPS remained unstable; SSP announced in December 2020 that it would form a joint platform with the Movement of Free Citizens (PSG) regarding the inter-party dialogues on electoral conditions. This was opposed by the People's Party (Narodna), which ultimately led to the dissolution of UOPS in January 2021. 

SSP presented its political platform for the inter-party dialogues in February 2021. The dialogues lasted from July to October 2021, though SSP left the dialogues in September 2021 after stating that the proposed document is "unacceptable", claiming that the document does not offer concrete solutions regarding electoral conditions. After leaving the dialogues, SSP renewed its cooperation with Narodna, which led to the announcement that they would take part in a coalition for the 2022 general election. In November 2021, it was announced that Tepić would be the ballot representative of the joint coalition, which was mainly composed of SSP, Narodna, PSG, and the Democratic Party (DS).

2022–present 
Shortly before the January 2022 constitutional referendum, SSP called for citizens to not take part in the referendum. Later in January 2022, SSP proposed Zdravko Ponoš of Narodna as the presidential candidate of the joint coalition. This coalition was formalised in February 2022 under the name United for the Victory of Serbia (UZPS), when Ponoš was confirmed to be their joint presidential candidate. In the parliamentary election, UZPS won 14% of the popular vote and 10 seats in the National Assembly, while Ponoš won 18% of the popular vote, placing second behind Aleksandar Vučić, the incumbent president of Serbia. Additionally, SSP won 6 seats in the City Assembly of Belgrade in the 2022 Belgrade City Assembly election. Following the elections, Đilas met with Vučić to discuss about the outcome of the Belgrade City Assembly election. This resulted into criticism from Narodna, while DS also added that Đilas did not consult with other coalition members before the meeting. This ultimately led to the dissolution of UZPS.

Following the elections, SSP announced that it would form a joint parliamentary group with PSG, Movement for Reversal, and United Trade Unions of Serbia "Sloga" in the National Assembly and City Assembly of Belgrade; these groups were formalised under the name Ujedinjeni. Đilas was re-elected president of SSP in July 2022, while Stefanović, Tepić, and Bulatović retained their positions; Goran Petrović and Dušan Nikezić also became vice-presidents of the party. Bulatović however left SSP and the Ujedinjeni parliamentary group in December 2022, claiming that Tepić allegedly lobbies for the Serbian Progressive Party (SNS). He then met with several government ministers before forming the Alliance of Social Democrats citizens' group in January 2023.

Ideology and platform 
At the founding convention in April 2019, Đilas stated that SSP would focus on economic prosperity and education, and that it would adopt a "declaration of reconciliation" regarding the Kosovo issue. This declaration was presented in May 2019, with SSP stating that the declaration "predicts the way to solve the people's life problems in Kosovo". SSP serves in opposition to SNS.

Ideologically, SSP has been described as a social-democratic and social-liberal party, and it has been positioned on the centre-left on the political spectrum. Dušan Spasojević, a professor at the Faculty of Political Sciences of University of Belgrade, noted that within the party, Đilas is closer to the political centre, while Tepić is significantly more leftist. Regarding social issues, Spasojević positioned SSP on the centre-left. SSP supported the manifestation of 2022 EuroPride in Belgrade. An anti-corruption party, SSP proposed a law regarding the "fight against corruption of public officeholders" in November 2019; Tepić noted that the proposal was written on the model of practice of former Romanian anti-corruption prosecutor Laura Kövesi. SSP is also opposed to "party employment", saying that "it should not matter whether you are a member of a political party, but whether you have the qualifications to do a certain job". In July 2022, SSP criticised attacks on investigative journalists. SSP criticised the increase on toll fees in June 2019, claiming that the quality of the roads has not improved since 2017, when the toll fees were previously increased. Later in December 2019, SSP presented its proposed law on the origin of property at its party session, which according to Stefanović would confiscate property from those who cannot prove that they acquired it legally. According to its programme from 2020, SSP guaranteed to "implement tax reforms that would introduce a progressive taxation of citizens' income and reduce taxes and contributions to 60% of net earnings", while it also stated its support for abolishing parafiscal taxes and introduce tax reliefs for donations and endowments in health, culture, and sports. SSP supports financing free textbooks and school meals for school children in Serbia; in September 2022, SSP also said that "with the reduction of corruption and abolishment of unnecessary projects, enough money would be collected to finance free schoolbooks and higher salaries for educators". SSP has criticised workers' conditions in Serbia and has called for the adoption of a new labour law that would according to SSP "increase wages that could be then used to live with dignity". Đilas also stated that he is opposed to neoliberalism, calling it "not just wrong, but life-threatening".

SSP supports the accession of Serbia to the European Union, stating that "Serbia's future is in Europe". SSP also wants Serbia to harmonise its foreign policy with the European Union, and has urged the government to continue the integration of Serbia to the European Union. Following the beginning of the 2022 Russian invasion of Ukraine, SSP has called for the end of the war in Ukraine, stated its support for the territorial integrity of Ukraine, and has called for humanitarian aid to be sent to the vulnerable population. Initially, SSP was opposed to sanctioning Russia, though they reversed this position after the 2022 general election. Đilas later criticised political neutrality regarding the issue, stating that "neutrality is treated as siding with [Russia]"; he also said that Serbia should remain military neutral but with a clear position regarding the war in Ukraine. In November 2022, SSP proposed a resolution that would align Serbia's foreign policy with the European Union and implement sanctions on Russia. SSP criticised Chinese investments into Serbian infrastructure, claiming that "Serbia became the first Chinese colony in Europe". Regarding Belgrade, SSP stated its support for the termination of the contract with the investor of Belgrade Waterfront in April 2021. SSP called for the end of "environmental massacre" in Aleksinac in May 2019, claiming that the trees in the centre of Aleksinac were cut down illegally. SSP criticised the ministry of environmental protection regarding the quality of air in Bor in June 2019, claiming that the government ignored excessive air pollution with sulfur dioxide and heavy metal particles. Regarding regional cooperation, SSP has adopted a platform in which they pledged "reconciliation, cooperation, and the acceptance of diversity" between countries in the Balkans. SSP condemned the Srebrenica genocide, stating that "11 July should be the remembrance of the genocide in Srebrenica", and that "the Balkans should function on the principles of tolerance and cooperation".

Demographic characteristics 
According to a Heinrich Böll Foundation research from November 2020, supporters of SSP saw themselves as socially progressive and economically leftist. The researchers also noted that voters that would prefer more liberal preferences were also orientated towards SSP. Spasojević noted in 2022 that its supporters closely represented the views of Tepić than Đilas, while he also noted that its voters are pro-European.

Organisation 
SSP is led by Dragan Đilas, who was most recently re-elected in 2022. Additionally, Stefanović serves as the party's deputy president, while Tepić, Nikezić, and Petrović serve as vice-presidents of SSP. Alongside them, Velibor Pavlović serves as the president of the party's executive board, Peđa Mitrović serves as the general-secretary of SSP, and Ana Stevanović serves as the international secretary of SSP. Its headquarters are located at Danijelova 12-16 in Belgrade. SSP has a youth wing named the SSP Youth and a women's wing named Women's Network.

International cooperation 
Đilas met with Zoran Zaev, the president of the Social Democratic Union of Macedonia, in February 2019 with whom he discussed about cooperation between SSP and Zaev's party. As the representative of SSP, Đilas took part in a meeting that was organised by the Party of European Socialists (PES) in May 2020, where he expressed his party's position regarding the 2020 parliamentary election and European Union. In November 2022, SSP formed connections with the Social Democratic Party of Austria which stated its support for SSP to be admitted into PES. As the representative of SSP, Tepić took part in the Global Progressive Forum which was organised by PES in December 2022.

In the Parliamentary Assembly of the Council of Europe, SSP is represented by Tatjana Pašić, who sits in the Socialists, Democrats and Greens Group, while in the Congress of Local and Regional Authorities, SSP is represented by Marko Dimić, who is a substitute and sits as a "non-registered" member.

List of presidents

Electoral performance

Parliamentary elections

Presidential elections

Provincial elections

Belgrade City Assembly elections

References

External links 

 Official website

2019 establishments in Serbia
Political parties established in 2019
Pro-European political parties in Serbia
Social democratic parties in Serbia
Social liberal parties
Centre-left parties in Europe
Anti-corruption parties